Gaujiena Parish is an administrative unit of Smiltene Municipality, Latvia. The administrative center is the village of Gaujiena.

Towns, villages and settlements of Gaujiena Parish 
 Dārzciems
 Gaujiena
 Mežciems
 Zvārtava

See also 
 Gaujiena Castle
 Gaujiena Palace
 Zvārtava Manor

References 

Parishes of Latvia
Smiltene Municipality